Zinc finger protein 746 also known as Parkin-interacting substrate (PARIS) is a zinc finger protein that, in humans, is encoded by the ZNF746 gene and is involved in the neurodegeneration of Parkinson's disease.

References